Jeff Ballard is an American jazz drummer. He has played with Ray Charles and Pat Metheny and played periodically with Chick Corea in many groups such as Origin and the Chick Corea New Trio. He also played with many New York-based jazz musicians such as Reid Anderson, Brad Mehldau, Kurt Rosenwinkel, Mark Turner, Miguel Zenon and Eli Degibri. He has also played with the Joshua Redman Elastic Band.

He is a member of the Brad Mehldau Trio (since 2005) and co-leader of Fly, a collective trio with Mark Turner and Larry Grenadier and leads Jeff Ballard Trio and Jeff Ballard Fairgrounds.

Biography
Jeff Ballard was born 17 September 1963 in southern California but grew up and studied in Santa Cruz, California.  He began playing drums at the age of 14, attended Cabrillo College where he studied music theory, and toured with many bands, all the time absorbing influences and developing his own approach to drumming. He met Larry Grenadier in 1982, with whom he plays in both Fly and Brad Mehldau Trio. At the age of 24 he went on the road with Ray Charles for eight months every year 1988-1990 playing in Charles' Big Band. He moved to New York in 1990, where he started collaborating with Ben Monder, Kurt Rosenwinkel, Mark Turner and Ben Allison. Later on in New York he started to play with Avishai Cohen and Chick Corea. Ballard started the band Fly with Larry Grenadier and Mark Turner around the time Ballard was working with Corea. During a performance with Fly trio in New York city in 2005, pianist Brad Mehldau was invited to sit in, which led to Brad inviting Jeff to join his own trio subbing for Jorge Rossy, who for some time had been planning on moving back to Spain to focus on his piano playing. He formed the Jeff Ballard Trio with Lionel Loueke and Miguel Zenon, releasing Time’s Tales (Okeh) as the recording debut for Ballard as leader in 2014. His second album as leader is Fairgrounds (Edition Records) released January 2019 with Lionel Loueke, Kevin Hays and Reid Anderson with guest appearances from Mark Turner and Chris Cheek.

Awards
 Best Debut Album, 2014, NPR Music Jazz Critics Poll, Time's Tales
 Best Instrumentalist / International Drums/Percussion, Echo Jazz Awards 2015 Time's Tales

Gallery

Discography

As leader 
  Jeff Ballard Trio, Time's Tales with Lionel Loueke, Miguel Zenón (OKeh, 2013)
 Fairgrounds (Edition, 2019) – live recorded in 2015

As group 
Fly
With Mark Turner and Larry Grenadier
 2003: Fly (Savoy Jazz, 2004)
 2008: Sky & Country (ECM, 2009)
 2011: Year of the Snake (ECM, 2012)

SFJAZZ Collective
　Live: SFJAZZ Center 2013 - The Music of Chick Corea (SFJAZZ, 2013)[2CD]

As a sideman 

With Avishai Cohen
 Adama (Stretch, 1998) – recorded in 1997
 Devotion (Stretch, 1999)		
 Colors (Stretch, 2000)

With Chick Corea
 Change (Rykodisk, 1999)
 Corea.Concerto: Spain For Sextet & Orchestra / Piano Concerto No.1 (Sony Classical, 2000)
 Past, Present & Future (Stretch, 2001)
 Rendezvous in New York (Stretch, 2003) – live
 5trios – 3. Chillin' in Chelan (Stretch, 2007)

With Brad Mehldau
 Day Is Done (Nonesuch, 2005)
 Metheny/Mehldau (Nonesuch, 2006)
 Metheny Mehldau Quartet (Nonesuch, 2007)
 Brad Mehldau Trio Live (Nonesuch, 2008)
 Highway Rider (Nonesuch, 2010)
 Ode (Nonesuch, 2012) – recorded in 2011
 Where Do You Start (Nonesuch, 2012) – recorded in 2008–11
 Blues and Ballads (Nonesuch, 2016) – recorded in 2012–14
 Seymour Reads the Constitution! (Nonesuch, 2018)

With Pat Metheny
 2005: Metheny/Mehldau (Nonesuch, 2006)
 2005: Metheny Mehldau Quartet (Nonesuch, 2007)

With Kurt Rosenwinkel
 The Enemies of Energy (Verve, 2000) – recorded in 1996
 The Next Step  (Verve, 2001) – recorded in 2000
 Heartcore  (Verve, 2003) – recorded in 2001–03
 Deep Song  (Verve, 2005)

With others
 Chihiro Yamanaka, Madrigal (Atelier  Sawano, 2004)
 Ted Nash, Sidewalk Meeting (Arabesque, 2001) – recorded in 2000
 Joshua Redman, Momentum (Verve, 2005)

References

External links
 Official website
 AllAboutJazz

American jazz drummers
Jazz musicians from California
1963 births
Living people
Musicians from Santa Cruz, California
20th-century American drummers
American male drummers
20th-century American male musicians
American male jazz musicians
21st-century American drummers
Fly (band) members
SFJAZZ Collective members
21st-century American male musicians
Edition Records artists
Okeh Records artists